Alexandru Dulghier is a Moldovan footballer who plays as forward for FC Milsami Orhei.

References

External links
 

1995 births
Living people
Moldovan footballers
FC Milsami Orhei players

Association football forwards